"Hate the Way" is a song by American rapper G-Eazy, featuring American musician Blackbear. It was released by RCA Records on October 16, 2020, as a standalone single. The song was written by Alyssa Cantu, Benjamin Shubert, Gerald Earl Gillum, Matthew Musto, Mike Crook, Ryan Ogren and produced by Mike Crook, Ryan Ogren. It was later included on the deluxe edition of G-Eazy's fourth studio album These Things Happen Too.

Background
G-Eazy shared: "I've experienced love in my life," and "I've experienced heartbreak in my life and caused heartbreak in my life and received heartbreak in my life. The power of music is to express and capture the human experience. We live and we experience things. Music for us is an outlet, a way to channel the things we go through and put into a tangible forum."

Music video
The video was uploaded on October 16, 2020, directed by Katarina Webber. It features G-Eazy alongside Blackbear and actress Bria Vinaite from A24's Florida Project.

Live performance
On October 21, 2020, G-Eazy and Blackbear performed the song together for the first time during a virtual concert and livestreamed from the iconic Hollywood Roosevelt Hotel in Los Angeles, California.

Charts

Certifications

References

2020 singles
2020 songs
G-Eazy songs
Blackbear (musician) songs
RCA Records singles
Songs written by G-Eazy
Songs written by Blackbear (musician)
Songs written by Ryan Ogren